Get Fresh is a children's television programme that originally aired from 1986 to 1988 in the United Kingdom.

Format

A Saturday-morning kids' TV show, broadcast on the Children's ITV network, the show featured Gareth Jones (aka Gaz Top), Charlotte Hindle, and, for the first year of its run, Gian Sammarco, the British child actor best known for his portrayal of the character 'Adrian Mole'.  Sammarco was replaced for the 2nd and 3rd series by a puppet named Gilbert the Alien (voiced by Phil Cornwell).

Each week the series would be broadcast from a different UK location and centred on the Millennium Dustbin, a fictional space ship in which the presenters would travel the country. The show invited a live audience to attend and give vox-pop comments, to give presentations on local community activities, and to participate in games and challenges. Pop stars would also appear to perform on the show.

The weekly music strand of the show featured musical guest interviews and pop gossip. The segment was hosted each week by Nino Firetto and David 'Kid' Jensen.

The show featured a unique play-by-phone challenge, using the Amiga video game Xenon, where viewers would call in and shout "left, left, right, shoot" commands to a blindfolded player. Get Fresh also featured the animated series The Centurions and The Adventures of the Galaxy Rangers.

Spin-offs
Get Fresh Sunday was a pre-recorded Sunday morning edition of the show also presented by Gaz, Charlotte and Gilbert. This spin-off featured The Adventures of Teddy Ruxpin and Gummi Bears and studio-based interviews and features, and was more item-based than the activity driven Saturday live show.

Gilbert later featured in a further two series for Tyne Tees Television, Gilbert's Fridge (1988) and Gilbert's Late (1990).

Production notes
The series was administrated by Tyne Tees Television from a Central Unit based at their London office, but was produced in conjunction with the local ITV station from where the series was to broadcast that week.

Get Fresh Sunday was produced solely by Border Television.

The theme music for the programme was written by Mick Jones of The Clash and Big Audio Dynamite fame.

Series 1 - 1986 
 
 3 May - The Glebe, Windermere (Border) 
 10 May - Coney Beach Pleasure Park, Porthcawl (HTV Wales) 
 17 May - Tuxedo Princess, Newcastle (Tyne Tees) 
 24 May - Glasgow Mayfest (Scottish) 
 31 May - Carmunnock Highland Games (Scottish) 
 7 June - Portrush (Ulster) 
 14 June - Cardiff Castle (HTV Wales) 
 21 June - Colchester Zoo (Anglia) 
 28 June - Bath Festival of Steam (HTV West) 
 5 July - Weymouth Beach (TSW) 
 12 July - Bellahouston Park, Glasgow (Scottish) 
 19 July - Aberdeen (Grampian) 
 26 July - Swaffham (Anglia)
 2 August - Whitehaven Harbour (Border) 
 9 August - Scone Palace, Perth (Grampian) 
 16 August - Ashton Court Park, Bristol (HTV West) 
 23 August - Tyne Tees Studios, Newcastle (Tyne Tees)
 30 August - Carlisle Castle (Border) 
 6 September - Beamish Open Air Museum, County Durham (Tyne Tees) 
 13 September - Plymouth Hoe (TSW)

Series 2 - 1987 
 25 April and 2 May - "Get Ready for Get Fresh" (Studio-based episodes made by Border)
 9 May - Sheepmount Athletics track, Carlisle (Border)  
 16 May - Yeovil (TSW)  
 23 May - Duxford Air Museum (Anglia)  
 30 May - Edinburgh Castle (Scottish)  
 6 June - Aberdeen Exhibition and Conference Centre (Grampian)  
 13 June - Lakeland Forum, Enniskillen (Ulster)  
 20 June - Ulster Folk Museum (Ulster)  
 27 June - New Lanark Old Mill Town (Scottish)  
 4 July - Cardiff Ice Rink (HTV Wales)  
 11 July - Plymouth (TSW)  
 18 July - Newquay (TSW)  
 25 July - Kelso Agricultural Fair (Border)  
 1 August - Clydebank (Scottish)  
 8 August - Northumberland Scout and Guide Camp, Gosforth Park (Tyne Tees)  
 15 August - Border TV, Carlisle (Border)  
 22 August - Norwich (Anglia)  
 29 August - Bristol (HTV West)

Series 3 - 1988

 9 April - Newcastle, County Down (Ulster)  
 16 April - Giant's Causeway (Ulster)  
 23 April - Maritime Museum, Exeter (TSW)  
 30 April - Lord Montagu's Transport Museum, Beaulieu (TVS)  
 7 May - St Austell (TSW)  
 14 May - Great Yarmouth (Anglia)  
 21 May - Galloway Games, Stranraer (Border)  
 28 May - Ferry Meadows Country Park, Peterborough (Anglia)  
 4 June - Roman fort, South Shields (Tyne Tees)  
 11 June - Dundee (Grampian)  
 18 June - Killington Lake services (Border)  
 25 June - Glasgow Show, Bellahouston Park (Scottish)  
 2 July - Summerlee Heritage Trust, Coatbridge (Scottish)  
 9 July - Eden Court Theatre, Inverness (Grampian)  
 16 July - Glasgow Garden Festival (Scottish)  
 23 July - Teignmouth (TSW)  
 30 July - Douglas, Isle of Man (Border)  
 6 August - Metrocentre, Gateshead (Tyne Tees)  
 13 August - Tropicana, Weston-super-Mare (HTV West)
 20 August - Tavistock Meadows (TSW)  
 27 August - Margam Country Park, Port Talbot (HTV Wales)

Transmission guide

Series 1: 20 editions from 3 May 1986 – 13 September 1986
Series 2: 19 editions from 25 April 1987 – 29 August 1987
Series 3: 21 editions from 9 April 1988 – 28 August 1988

References

External links
 
 Get Fresh on Paul Morris' SatKids

1986 British television series debuts
1988 British television series endings
1980s British children's television series
ITV children's television shows
British television shows featuring puppetry
Television series by ITV Studios
English-language television shows
Television shows produced by Tyne Tees Television
Television shows produced by Border Television
Television shows produced by Harlech Television (HTV)
Television shows produced by Anglia Television
Television shows produced by Television South West (TSW)
Television shows produced by Television South (TVS)
Television shows produced by Ulster Television
Television shows produced by Scottish Television
Television shows produced by Grampian Television